The 1864 United States presidential election in Maryland took place on November 8, 1864, as part of the 1864 United States presidential election. Maryland voters chose seven representatives, or electors, to the Electoral College, who voted for president and vice president.

Maryland was won by the incumbent President Abraham Lincoln (R-Illinois), running with former Senator and Military Governor of Tennessee Andrew Johnson, with 55.09% of the popular vote, against the 4th Commanding General of the United States Army George B. McClellan (D–New Jersey), running with Representative George H. Pendleton, with 44.91% of the vote.

This was the last time that a Republican would win Maryland in a presidential election until William McKinley won it in 1896.

Results

Results by county

See also
 United States presidential elections in Maryland
 1864 United States presidential election
 1864 United States elections

Notes

References 

Maryland
1864
Presidential